Karim Achahbar (born 3 January 1996) is a professional footballer who plays as a forward for the reserve team of Chamois Niortais. Born in France, he represented Morocco at international youth levels.

Club career
Achahbar joined EA Guingamp in 2014. He contributed to EA Guingamp's 2013–14 Coupe de France trophy by playing against FC Bourg-Péronnas on 5 January 2014 and made his league debut against Montpellier HSC on 27 September 2014.

On 18 August 2015, he was loaned to Vendée Luçon.

International career
Achahbar was a member of the Morocco national U-17 team for the 2013 FIFA U-17 World Cup. In this competition, he played 4 games and scored 3 goals.

Career statistics

Club

Honours
EA Guingamp
Coupe de France: 2013–14

References

Expatriate footballers in Belgium
1996 births
Living people
People from Guingamp
Association football forwards
Moroccan footballers
Morocco youth international footballers
French footballers
French sportspeople of Moroccan descent
Ligue 1 players
Championnat National players
Championnat National 3 players
En Avant Guingamp players
Luçon FC players
US Quevilly-Rouen Métropole players
A.F.C. Tubize players
Sportspeople from Côtes-d'Armor
Footballers from Brittany